Kannus Airfield is a former airfield in Kannus, Finland, about  east of Kannus town centre. The airfield was closed on 6 April 2021.

See also
List of airports in Finland

References

External links
 VFR Suomi/Finland – Kannus Airfield
 Lentopaikat.net – Kannus Airfield 

Defunct airports in Finland